Claus Michael Møller (born 3 October 1968) is a Danish former professional cyclist. He competed in the individual road race at the 1992 Summer Olympics. He turned professional in 1995 with the Castellblanch team before moving to Milaneza MSS in 2000. He won the overall classification of the Volta a Portugal in 2002, and was a stage winner in the 2001 Vuelta a España. He also won the Subida al Naranco in 2001, and won stages of the Volta a Portugal and the Trofeo Mallorca. His career was marred in the late 1990s by a suspension for doping; as a result he was also banned for life from representing the Danish national team.

Major results
Source: 

1990
 1st Stage 1a Tour de Normandie
1991
 6th Overall Tour of Sweden
1992
 1st Grand Prix Herning
1994
 1st Overall Vuelta a Extremadura
 1st Overall 
1st Stage 3
 3rd Overall Rapport Toer
1995
 1st 
 1st 
 1st 
 1st Stage 6 Vuelta a Extremadura
 2nd Overall Rutas de América
 3rd Overall Vuelta a Castilla y León
1st Stage 3
1997
 4th Overall Vuelta a Murcia
 8th Overall Vuelta a Aragón
 8th Trofeo Comunidad Foral de Navarra
1999
 4th Overall Vuelta a Murcia
 4th Overall Vuelta a Andalucía
 6th Overall Volta a la Comunitat Valenciana
2000
 1st  Overall Volta ao Alentejo
1st Stage 4
 1st Overall Grande Prémio Sport Noticias
1st Stage 5
 1st Stage 3b (ITT) Troféu Joaquim Agostinho
 2nd Overall Volta a Portugal
1st Stage 7
 3rd Overall Grande Prémio Jornal de Notícias
 9th Overall Vuelta a Asturias
2001
 1st Subida al Naranco
 8th Overall Vuelta a España
1st Stage 15
 8th Overall Volta a Portugal
2002
 1st  Overall Volta a Portugal
1st Stages 9 & 13 (ITT)
 3rd Overall Volta a la Comunitat Valenciana
 6th Overall Volta ao Alentejo
 8th Overall Vuelta a Murcia
2003
 1st  Overall Volta ao Algarve
1st Stage 4 (ITT)
 2nd Overall Volta a Portugal
1st Stage 11 (ITT)
 3rd Overall Gran Premio Mosqueteros-Ruta del Marqués
1st Stage 4 (ITT)
 7th Overall Paris–Nice
2005
 7th Overall Volta a Portugal
1st Stage 10 (ITT)
 9th Overall Troféu Joaquim Agostinho
2006
 6th Overall Volta a Portugal

Grand Tour general classification results timeline

WD = Withdrew

References

External links

1968 births
Living people
Doping cases in cycling
Danish sportspeople in doping cases
Danish male cyclists
Danish Vuelta a España stage winners
People from Hjørring
Olympic cyclists of Denmark
Cyclists at the 1992 Summer Olympics
Volta a Portugal winners
Sportspeople from the North Jutland Region